Neocalyptrocalyx is a genus of flowering plants belonging to the family Capparaceae.

Its native range is Northern South America to Northern and Eastern Brazil.

Species:

Neocalyptrocalyx eichleriana 
Neocalyptrocalyx grandipetala 
Neocalyptrocalyx leprieurii 
Neocalyptrocalyx maroniensis 
Neocalyptrocalyx morii 
Neocalyptrocalyx muco 
Neocalyptrocalyx nectareus

References

Capparaceae
Brassicales genera